House on Hangman's Hill is an adventure for fantasy role-playing games published by Judges Guild in 1981.

Plot summary
House on Hangman's Hill is a scenario for character levels 3-4 set in a haunted house of the classic type.

Near the village of Hedgehill there is a sprawling mansion, haunted by its unjustly-executed owner.  The player characters enter by one of six doors and wander through 38 rooms of illusions, fun house effects, and encounters until they destroy the offending revenant or run away.

Publication history
House on Hangman's Hill was written by Jon Mattson, and was published by Judges Guild in 1981 as a 32-page book.

Reception
Ian L. Straus reviewed the adventure in The Space Gamer No. 52. He commented that, "True to the horror-movie theme, some eerie events who no consequences are included just to make the players jump.  There are also NPCs, rats, werewolves, and plenty of undead.  Some of the worst fights can be avoided, so players who automatically charge will be punished.  The room paragraphs are well-organized, and the map is amply detailed." He continued: "However, a haunted-house atmosphere may not suit all players.  If you break the mood, the map becomes another generic dungeon with a few more exits.  D&D players always partook more of horror movies than Conan, and the players may see no difference.  The DM should add marginal reminders (to himself) to mention cobwebs and creaking doors.  The floor plan is a 400' x 280' ranch house; it would match both the cover art and horror movies better if it had three stories.  I suggest you rescale the map from 10' to 5' squares before you run it.  I also suggest you encourage the party to walk around the outside.  It is a house, not a burrow; give the players a grid sheet with door and outside walls marked." Straus concluded the review by saying, "This adventure will be enjoyable if some of the players are horror movie fans.  Average characters should be third- or fourth-level because more powerful parties will not have the fun of being scared."

Reviews
 Different Worlds #19 (Feb., 1982)

References

Judges Guild fantasy role-playing game adventures
Role-playing game supplements introduced in 1981